Cryptid Hunters is a 2005 young adult science fiction novel by Roland Smith; it follows the adventures of thirteen-year-old siblings Grace and Marty O'Hara, who are sent to live with their Uncle Wolfe after their parents are lost in an accident. He is an anthropologist on a remote island, searching for cryptids, which are animals thought to be extinct or not to exist. His rival Noah Blackwood, a popular animal collector, tries to acquire an alleged dinosaur egg from Wolfe, and the twins get involved in the conflict which reveals a convoluted family history. The novel was nominated for several library awards and book lists, which include Hawaii's 2008 Nene Recommended Book List, the Texas Library Association's 2007-2008 Lone Star Reading List, and Third Place for the Missouri Association of School Librarians' Mark Twain Readers Award. Smith has written three sequels called Tentacles, Chupacabra, and Mutation.

Reception
A Kirkus magazine review described the story as "a B-movie with email".  The "enjoyably rollicking adventures are appropriately cheesy; the stereotypes, though equally fitting, are a bit much." Author Wendy Sparrow wrote that "the book was like the Magic Treehouse kids all grown up and taking on Jurassic Park or Journey to the Center of the Earth." She enjoyed Grace and Marty's "fun and real" personalities. The five-year-old technology was not dated, and the book was surprisingly audience-friendly that she could read it to her seven-year-old son. A review in Publishers Weekly read, "This unsatisfying journey is less about cryptids than it is about soap opera–esque family intrigue".

Publication
A list of notable formats is as follows:

Accolades
The following states and organizations have placed Cryptid Hunters on their suggested reading lists:
 2009-2010 Young Hoosier Book Award, Middle School category, Indiana Library Federation.
 2008 Nene Recommended Book List, Hawaii.
 2007-2008 Mark Twain Readers Award - 3rd Place, Missouri Association of School Librarians.
 2007-2008 South Carolina Junior Book Award nominee, 6th-8th Grade, South Carolina Association of School Librarians.
 2007 Colorado Children's Book Award nominee, Junior Book, Colorado Council International Reading Association.
 2007 Nevada Young Readers Award winner, Intermediate Category, Nevada Library Association.
 2006-2007 Black-Eyed Susan Award nominee, Maryland.
 2006-2007 Lone Star Reading List, Grades 6-8, Texas Library Association.
 2006-2007 Sunshine State Young Readers Award winner, grades 3-5, Florida Association for Media in Education.

Notes

References

External links
 Cryptid Hunters on Scholastic

2005 American novels
2005 science fiction novels
American science fiction novels
Children's science fiction novels
Novels by Roland Smith
Novels set in the Democratic Republic of the Congo